The Headwaters Wilderness is a  wilderness area located within the Nicolet unit of the Chequamegon-Nicolet National Forest in northeastern Wisconsin. It is the largest federally designated wilderness area on Wisconsin's mainland.

The wilderness area contains the headwaters of the Pine River, a legally protected wild river and a tributary of the Menominee River. The landscape is primarily forested swampland and bogs; the generally flat terrain is covered by pine forest, with some features of northern hardwood forests.

The northern section of the wilderness area contains Kimball Creek, which feeds into the Pine River. In the southwest is the Shelp Lake unit, containing some of the largest and oldest trees in the national forest. In the southeast section features the Pine River, which flows east out of the forest towards the upper peninsula of Michigan.

The Headwaters Wilderness area provides opportunities for hiking, although most trails are primitive and the area contains only a few miles of designated hiking trails. The trails travel past old growth eastern white pine and eastern hemlock, some of Wisconsin's oldest and largest trees. Hunting, fishing, and birdwatching are other popular activities. Several species of bird that are uncommon in Wisconsin can be found in the area including Canada jays, boreal chickadees, and black-backed woodpeckers.

See also
 List of U.S. Wilderness Areas
 Wilderness Act

References

External links
 Official Site at United States Forest Service
 Headwaters - Wilderness.net

IUCN Category Ib
Protected areas of Forest County, Wisconsin
Wilderness areas of Wisconsin
Protected areas established in 1984
1984 establishments in Wisconsin